Gratas Sirgėdas (born 17 December 1994) is a Lithuanian footballer who plays as a midfielder for FK Kauno Žalgiris.

Club career 
He scored 5 goals for the National Football Academy in the I Lyga. On 20 August 2013 Sirgėdas moved to VfB Stuttgart II.

Sirgėdas returned to Lithuania in August 2017, signing a contract with A Lyga side Kauno Žalgiris.

In December 2018 became a member of FK Sūduva.

On 16 January 2020 Kauno Žalgiris wrote about returning to team.

International career 
Sirgėdas made his debut for the Lithuania national senior team on 10 September 2013 in the 2014 FIFA World Cup qualification against Liechtenstein.

International goals
Scores and results list Lithuania's goal tally first.

References

External links 
 Gratas Sirgėdas at uefa.com
 Gratas Sirgėdas at futbolinis.lt
 Gratas Sirgėdas at Kicker

1994 births
Living people
Sportspeople from Panevėžys
Lithuanian footballers
Lithuania international footballers
Lithuania under-21 international footballers
Lithuanian expatriate footballers
Association football midfielders
VfB Stuttgart II players
FC Amberg players
FK Kauno Žalgiris players
FK Sūduva Marijampolė players
3. Liga players
A Lyga players
Expatriate footballers in Germany
Lithuanian expatriate sportspeople in Germany